Mississippi Highway 348 (MS 348) is a  east-west state highway in the North Central Hills of North Mississippi. It connects the cities of New Albany and Guntown, via the community of Ellistown.

Route description

MS 348 begins in Union County in the city of New Albany, at an intersection with MS 15/MS 30 just southeast of downtown. It heads southeast along Center Street through neighborhoods before leaving the city and winding its way through hilly woodlands for the next several miles, passing through the communities of Center and Mound City. The highway becomes concurrent with MS 9 between the communities of Ellistown and Branyan before entering Lee County.

MS 348 immediately crosses Camp Creek before traveling due east through farmland for the next several miles, passing through the communities of Boggan Bend and Blair, to enter the city of Guntown, just shortly before an interchange with U.S. Route 45 (US 45). It enters town along North Main Street and has an intersection with MS 145 where state maintenance and signage for the highway ends. The road then travels through neighborhoods, becoming Bryson Street as Main Street splits off to head south through downtown. The highway continues east to cross a railroad track before state maintenance, as well as MS 348, comes to an end at the intersection between East Mill Street and Bryson Street.

The entire length of Mississippi Highway 348 is a two-lane highway.

Major intersections

References

External links

348
Transportation in Union County, Mississippi
Transportation in Lee County, Mississippi